O Music Recordings is an Italian independent record label that releases pop and dance music. Their headquarters are located in Milan. The label was founded in 2016 by Otto Orlandi. In 2018, the label began a partnership with Sony Music.

Label History 
In 2016, Otto Orlandi launched the O Music Recordings label primarily in order to have full creative control over the release and handling of his own music productions. The label's first release came in February 2017 with "Don't Miss You".

Don't Miss You 
The label's most successful release to date is "Don't Miss You", a collaboration between Orlandi and ManyFew, featuring vocals from Melanie Fontana. The original mix of "Don't Miss You" reached #7 in the iTunes Italy chart and spent 55 days in total in the top 100. It also spent a total of 8 weeks in the Spotify Italy Top 200 weekly chart, peaking at #72, and entered the Spotify Italy Viral 50 daily chart at #31. As of 27 Jan 2019, the track has been streamed over 2.6 million times on Spotify. Orlandi and Fontana released a follow-up single in July 2017 on O Music Recordings titled "Seven Days". At the end of 2018 the track had received close to 1 million plays on Spotify.

Sony Music Partnership 
To date, O Music Recordings has released 2 singles, both by Orlandi, in partnership with Sony Music: "Fever" (featuring RAYNE and Karmello) and "Oddest Goddess" (with The Chordz featuring Ayah Marar).

Current Artists 

 Adn
 Ayah Marar
 The Chordz
Faiet
 Karmello
 ManyFew
Mark Voss
 Melanie Fontana
Molly Marrs
 Otto Orlandi
 RAYNE
Sophie C
Thatsimo

Label Discography

References 

Italian record labels
Record labels established in 2016
Pop record labels
Electronic music record labels
Italian companies established in 2016
Italian independent record labels
Companies based in Milan